Kyuhei Ueno is a Japanese mixed martial artist. He competed in the Featherweight, Lightweight and Welterweight division.

Mixed martial arts record

|-
| Loss
| align=center| 10-5-1
| Satoshi Fujisaki
| Submission (armbar)
| Shooto - Shooter's Dream
| 
| align=center| 1
| align=center| 2:23
| Setagaya, Tokyo, Japan
| 
|-
| Loss
| align=center| 10-4-1
| Naoki Mori
| Decision (unanimous)
| Daidojuku - WARS 4
| 
| align=center| 5
| align=center| 3:00
| Tokyo, Japan
| 
|-
| Loss
| align=center| 10-3-1
| Rumina Sato
| Submission (rear-naked choke)
| Shooto - Vale Tudo Junction 2
| 
| align=center| 1
| align=center| 4:04
| Tokyo, Japan
| 
|-
| Win
| align=center| 10-2-1
| Naoki Mori
| Decision (unanimous)
| Daidojuku - WARS 3
| 
| align=center| 2
| align=center| 3:00
| Japan
| 
|-
| Win
| align=center| 9-2-1
| Arnold Sas
| Submission (triangle/armbar)
| Shooto - Vale Tudo Junction 1
| 
| align=center| 3
| align=center| 0:44
| Tokyo, Japan
| 
|-
| Win
| align=center| 8-2-1
| Toru Koga
| TKO (punches)
| Shooto - Tokyo Free Fight
| 
| align=center| 3
| align=center| 1:43
| Tokyo, Japan
| 
|-
| Win
| align=center| 7-2-1
| Kazuhiro Kusayanagi
| TKO (punches)
| Shooto - Complete Vale Tudo Access
| 
| align=center| 5
| align=center| 1:17
| Omiya, Saitama, Japan
| 
|-
| Win
| align=center| 6-2-1
| Maurice Roumimper
| Submission (armbar)
| Shooto - Vale Tudo Access 4
| 
| align=center| 1
| align=center| 1:42
| Japan
| 
|-
| Win
| align=center| 5-2-1
| Kenichi Tanaka
| Decision (unanimous)
| Shooto - Vale Tudo Access 3
| 
| align=center| 5
| align=center| 3:00
| Tokyo, Japan
| 
|-
| Loss
| align=center| 4-2-1
| Noboru Asahi
| Decision (unanimous)
| Shooto - Vale Tudo Access 2
| 
| align=center| 5
| align=center| 3:00
| Tokyo, Japan
| 
|-
| Loss
| align=center| 4-1-1
| Yuki Nakai
| Submission (arm-triangle choke)
| Shooto - Shooto
| 
| align=center| 5
| align=center| 0:32
| Tokyo, Japan
| 
|-
| Win
| align=center| 4-0-1
| Yoshihiko Abe
| KO
| Shooto - Shooto
| 
| align=center| 1
| align=center| 1:48
| Tokyo, Japan
| 
|-
| Win
| align=center| 3-0-1
| Hiroshi Yoshida
| Submission (armbar)
| Shooto - Shooto
| 
| align=center| 3
| align=center| 1:40
| Tokyo, Japan
| 
|-
| Draw
| align=center| 2-0-1
| Masato Suzuki
| Draw
| Shooto - Shooto
| 
| align=center| 4
| align=center| 3:00
| Tokyo, Japan
| 
|-
| Win
| align=center| 2-0
| Eiji Mizuno
| Submission (armbar)
| Shooto - Shooto
| 
| align=center| 1
| align=center| 2:07
| Tokyo, Japan
| 
|-
| Win
| align=center| 1-0
| Takenori Ito
| Submission (armbar)
| Shooto - Shooto
| 
| align=center| 1
| align=center| 2:35
| Tokyo, Japan
|

See also
List of male mixed martial artists

References

External links
 
 Kyuhei Ueno at mixedmartialarts.com
 Kyuhei Ueno at fightmatrix.com

Japanese male mixed martial artists
Featherweight mixed martial artists
Lightweight mixed martial artists
Welterweight mixed martial artists
Living people
Year of birth missing (living people)